The Fischa is a river of Lower Austria. It is a right tributary of the Danube near the town Fischamend.

References

Rivers of Lower Austria
Rivers of Austria